Rosemarie Schutz (born 15 November 1930) is a Canadian former alpine skier who competed in the 1952 Winter Olympics.

References

1930 births
Living people
Alpine skiers at the 1952 Winter Olympics
Canadian female alpine skiers
Olympic alpine skiers of Canada
Skiers from Montreal